Kirn is a town in Rhineland-Palatinate, Germany.

Kirn may also refer to:

Settlements
 Kirn, Argyll, a village on the Cowal peninsula, Scotland

Other uses
 Kirn (surname)
 KIRN, a radio station in Los Angeles
 Kirn dolly or kirn baby, Scots for a corn dolly

See also
 Kirner Land, a verbandsgemeinde ("collective municipality") located around Kirn, Germany
 Kern (disambiguation)